Sam is a 1967 American Western film directed by Larry Buchanan.

See also
 List of American films of 1967

External links
 

1967 films
1967 Western (genre) films
American Western (genre) films
Films directed by Larry Buchanan
1960s English-language films
1960s American films